The Stamford Pioneers were a minor league baseball team based in Stamford, Connecticut. From 1947 to 1949, Stamford teams played as members of the Class B  level Colonial League, winning the 1947 championship with an integrated roster in the era of segregated baseball. The Pioneers were preceded by the 1947 Stamford Bombers, with the teams hosting minor league home games at Mitchell Stadium.

History
Stamford first hosted the 1888 Stamford team, who played the season as members of the Connecticut State League.

The 1947 Stamford Bombers became members of the six–team, Class B level Colonial League, which reformed after last playing in 1915. The Bombers were joined by the Bridgeport Bees, New London Raiders, Port Chester Clippers, Poughkeepsie Giants and Waterbury Timers in beginning league play on May 7, 1947.

The Stamford franchise was owned by New York City entrepreneurs, Lou Haneles and Stan Moor. Haneles would serve as the teams' general manager and would integrate the team roster. In 1946 and 1947, 16 black players crossed the color line in minor league baseball. Six of them were signed by Haneles to Stamford in 1947.

On their home opening night, on May 8, 1947, 600 fans were in attendance in arctic weather at Mitchell Stadium. Colonial League president Ken Strong caught the first ball tossed by Stamford Mayor Charles E. Moore. Stamford defeated Waterbury, 16–5 in the game, as Stamford's Scotty Koproski hit the first recorded Colonial League home run.

In the era of segregated baseball, Stamford fielded six black players in 1947. Pitcher Al Preston joined the Stamford club from the New York Black Yankees on August 6, 1947  Preston played for Stamford in 1947 and 1948, and was joined by Carlos Santiago, on August 10, 1947. Santiago then played for Stanford in 1948 and 1949. Johnny Haith, Roy Lee, Jr., Andre Pulliza  and Fred Shepherd also played with Stamford in 1947.

In their first season of play, the Stamford Bombers won the 1947 Colonial League championship. The Bombers ended the regular season in 3rd place with a record of 67–51, finishing 19.5 games behind the 1st place Waterbury Timers. Playing under player/manager Zeke Bonura, the Bombers swept the Colonial League Playoffs. In the 1st round of playoffs, the Bombers defeated the pennant winning Waterbury Timers 4 games to 3. In the finals, the Stamford Bombers defeated the New London Raiders 4 games to 1 to win the championship. Vito DeVito
led the Colonial League with 128 runs scored, while teammate Sid Schacht had 180 strikeouts, to lead the league pitchers.

In 1948, the Pioneers finished last in the Colonial League standings. Stamford ended the 1948 season with a record of 54–78, placing 6th in the Colonial League and did not qualify for the playoffs. Zeke Bonura returned as manager. The Pioneers finished 28.5 games behind the 1st place Port Chester Clippers, as player/manager Zeke Bonura led the Colonial League with 23 home runs and Sid Schacht posted a 2.09 ERA, to lead the league.

In their final season, the Stamford Pioneers ended the 1949 Colonial League regular season in 2nd place. With a record of 74–52, playing the season under managers Joe Glenn and Herb Stein to finish 6.5 games behind the 1st place Bristol Owls. In the playoffs, the Pioneers played their final games as the Bridgeport Bees defeated Stamford Pioneers in a seven–game series. Jim Callahan led the Colonial League with 107 RBI, while teammates Ed Hrabczak and Emil Moscowitz each had 19 wins to lead the league.  Moscowitz had a 2.01 ERA and Hrabczak 234 strikeouts, leading the league in those categories as well.

Stamford folded following the 1949 season and did not field a team in the 1950 Colonial League. Stamford was replaced by the Torrington Braves in the league. Stamford has not hosted another minor league team.

The ballpark
The Stamford Bombers and Stamford Pioneers hosted minor league games at Mitchell Stadium. The ballpark was also called "Mitchell Field" and had a reputation for having long grass. The ballpark was located on Magee Avenue.

Timeline

Year–by–year records

Notable alumni

Zeke Bonura (1947–1948, MGR)
Joe Glenn (1949, MGR)
Lou Haneles (1947, Owner, GM)
Al Preston (1947–1948)
Carlos Santiago (1947–1949)
Sid Schacht (1947–1948)
Fred Shepherd (1947)

See also
Stamford Bombers playersStamford Pioneers players

References

External links
 Stamford - Baseball Reference

Defunct minor league baseball teams
Baseball teams established in 1948
Baseball teams disestablished in 1949
Stamford, Connecticut
Defunct Colonial League teams

Defunct baseball teams in Connecticut
Colonial League teams